Asphodelus albus, common name white asphodel, is a herbaceous perennial plant belonging to the genus Asphodelus.

Description
The plain stem is supported by fleshy, thickened roots (rhizomes). The white hermaphroditic flowers are funnel-shaped,  of diameter, with six elongated petals. The flowering period extends from April through June. The egg-shaped yellow-green seed capsules are usually  in length.

Subspecies

 Asphodelus albus subsp. carpetanus Z. Díaz & Valdés
 Asphodelus albus subsp. delphinensis (Gren. & Godr.) Z. Díaz & Valdés
 Asphodelus albus subsp. occidentalis (Jord.) Z.Díaz & Valdés
 Asphodelus albus subsp. villarsii (Verl. ex Billot) I. Richardson & Smythies

Distribution and habitat
This plant is native to the Mediterranean area. It is also found on the continent Africa, mainly in Libyan territory. Soils with a high lime content are preferred.

In culture

White asphodel is a feature of the Asphodel Meadows.
In Ancient Greece, white asphodel was associated with mourning and death. Its presence was held to facilitate the transition of the dead to Elysium.

White asphodel is also known by the name of branched lily or king's spear.

White asphodel roots were used as food staple in ancient Greece: According to Pliny the Elder, one plant could produce up to 80 tubers. Charles de L´ecluse wrote that he saw 200 tubers attached to one plant. Theophrastus mentioned that the roasted stalk and seeds could be used as food as well. Asphodel is supposed to have extended Epimenides life. The custom of planting graves in Greece with asphodel described in 1887 Macmillan's Magazine may have been to provide nourishment to the dead.

It was introduced as an ornamental in England in 1551, and as of 1887 "extensively used in Algeria for the manufacture of alcohol".

References

 Pignatti S. - Flora d'Italia - Edagricole – 1982 Vol. III, pag. 346
 Asphodelus albus Plants profile usda.gov
 Asphodelus albus zipcodezoo.com, 7/15/2012
 Asphodelus albus Encyclopædia Britannica

External links
 Biolib n.d. (Czech and English)
 Asphodelus albus n.d., luirig.altervista.org (in Italian)

Asphodeloideae
Flora of Europe
Flora of Italy
Plants described in 1799
Taxa named by Philip Miller